David Soren may refer to:

David Soren (animator) (born 1973), Canadian animator
David Soren (archaeologist) (born 1946), American archaeologist